James or Jim Bates may refer to:

James Bates (cricketer) (1856–1915), English cricketer
James Bates (Maine politician) (1789–1882), American politician from Maine
James K. Bates (1806–1872), New York physician and politician
James L. Bates (1820–1875), brigadier general in the American Civil War
James T. Bates (1844–1914), American businessman
James Woodson Bates (1788–1846), American lawyer and politician from Arkansas
Jim Bates (American football) (born 1946), former Miami Dolphins interim head coach
Jim Bates (politician) (born 1941), former U.S. Representative 
Jimmy Bates (1910–2009), Australian rules footballer
James Bates (conductor) (1952–2014), American conductor and organist
The American comedian best known as The Real Spark

See also
Jamie Bates (footballer) (born 1968), English footballer
Jamie Bates (born 1989), English welterweight kickboxer 
James Bate (1703–1775), English scholar and writer